Heikki Sappinen (5 October 1946 – 1 May 2009) was a Finnish gymnast. He competed in eight events at the 1968 Summer Olympics.

References

1946 births
2009 deaths
Finnish male artistic gymnasts
Olympic gymnasts of Finland
Gymnasts at the 1968 Summer Olympics
Sportspeople from Turku
20th-century Finnish people